Azteca Mexico by Adidas was the official match ball of 1986 FIFA World Cup held in Mexico. It was also the first fully synthetic FIFA World Cup ball.

The elaborately decorated design was inspired by the hosting nation’s native Aztec architecture and murals.

External links

 Adidas ball history

Azteca
1986 FIFA World Cup
Products introduced in 1986